Sattva (Sanskrit: सत्त्व, meaning honesty) is one of the three guṇas or "modes of existence" (tendencies, qualities, attributes), a philosophical and psychological concept understood by the Samkhya school of Hindu philosophy. The other two qualities are rajas (passion and activity) and tamas (destruction, chaos). Sattva is the quality of goodness, purity, positivity, truth, serenity, balance, peacefulness, and virtuousness that is drawn towards Dharma and Jnana (knowledge).

Hinduism
This category of qualities has been widely adopted by various schools of Hinduism for categorizing behavior and natural phenomena. The three qualities are:

 Sattva is the quality of balance, harmony, goodness, purity, universalizing, holistic, constructive, creative, building, positive attitude, luminous, serenity, being-ness, peaceful, virtuous.
 Rajas is the quality of passion, activity, neither good nor bad and sometimes either, self-centeredness, egoistic, individualizing, driven, moving, dynamic.
 Tamas is the quality of imbalance, disorder, chaos, anxiety, impure, destructive, delusion, negative, dull or inactive, apathy, inertia or lethargy, violent, vicious, ignorant.

In Indian philosophy, these qualities are not considered as present in either-or fashion. Rather, everyone and everything has all three, only in different proportions and in different contexts. The living being or substance is viewed as the net result of the joint effect of these three qualities.

According to the Samkhya school, no one and nothing is either purely sattvik or purely rajasik or purely tamasik. One's nature and behavior is a complex interplay of all of these, with each guna in varying degrees. In some, the conduct is rajasik with significant influence of sattvik guna, in some it is rajasik with significant influence of tamasik guna, and so on.

Buddhism
Sattva, or Satta in Pali language, is found in Buddhist texts, such as in Bodhi-sattva. The Sattva in Buddhism means "a living being, creature, person or sentient being".

See also 
 Sat (Sanskrit)
 Sattvik diet
 Satya
 Sentient beings (Buddhism)
 Vidya (Knowledge)

References

Further reading

External links 

 Sankhya: Sattva, Ferenc Ruzsa, IEP
 How to be Satvik

Guna